ALCC may refer to:

Airborne Launch Control Center, a portion of the US Air Force's Airborne Launch Control System
Anglo-Lutheran Catholic Church, an American Evangelical Catholic Christian denomination
Ashton Ladysmith Cricket Club, an English cricket club